Algonquin College of Applied Arts and Technology is a publicly funded English-language college located in  Ottawa, Ontario, Canada. The college serves the National Capital Region and the outlying areas of Eastern Ontario, Western Quebec, and Upstate New York. The college has three campuses, all in Ontario: a primary campus located in Ottawa, and secondary campuses located in Perth and Pembroke. The college offers bachelor's degrees, diplomas, and certificates in a range of disciplines and specialties. It has been ranked among the Top 50 Research Colleges in Canada  and has been recognized as one of Canada's top innovation leaders. The enabling legislation is the Ministry of Training, Colleges and Universities Act. It is a member of Polytechnics Canada.

History
The college was established during the formation of Ontario's college system in 1967.  Colleges of Applied Arts and Technology were established on May 21, 1965, when the Ontario system of public   colleges was created. The founding institutions were the Eastern Ontario Institute of Technology (established in 1957) and the Ontario Vocational Centre Ottawa (established in 1965 at the Woodroffe Campus and known as OVC). The original 8 acres site on Woodroffe Avenue was donated to the city by Mr and Mrs Frank Ryan.

The Ottawa architecture firm of Burgess, McLean & MacPhadyen designed the midcentury academic complex with open-ended blocks alternatively faced with long glass expanses in a semi-gambrel formation that make up the curtain walls and precast aggregate panels. The corporate campus or modernist academic acropolis spread across North America in the early 1960s. The entrance is via a deeply recessed terrace that's overhung with small white ceramic tiles and vintage can lights. The long walls are bumped out to float over the foundation. The foundation plantings keep the blocks from appearing stark.

The first Principal of the Ontario Vocational Centre (OVC) was Kenneth G. Shoultz.  Principal Shoultz took on the leadership of OVC in 1965 after working as a technical studies teacher and then as an inspector for the Ontario Department of Education.  K.G. Shoultz continued on as the first Dean of the Technical Centre after OVC was amalgamated with Algonquin College in 1967.

Algonquin College is named after the Algonquin First Nations Peoples who were the original inhabitants of the area.

In 1964, the Rideau Campus was established. "Satellite" campuses in Pembroke, Hawkesbury, Perth, Carleton Place and Renfrew were established in the late 1960s. The Vanier School of Nursing became a part of the Woodroffe Campus when nursing programs began to be offered at the college. In 1973, the School of Prescott-Russell joined the Algonquin family and the Colonel By Campus was created through the acquisition of St. Patrick's College. With the creation of La Cité Collégiale, 1990 marked the beginning of Algonquin as an English college.  The Hawkesbury campus was transferred to La Cité Collégiale, and the Renfrew, Colonel By, and Carleton Place campuses were progressively closed.  The latest closure was in August 2002, when the Rideau Campus closed and its programs were moved to the Advanced Technology Centre on the Woodroffe Campus.

Expanding its academic purview, the college offers a variety of degree programs taught by expert faculty with a wide range of academic and technical experience. This includes Bachelor of Interior Design (Honours), Bachelor of Public Safety (Honours), Bachelor of Early Learning and Community Development (Honours), Bachelor of Commerce (E-Supply Chain Management), and several others.

Woodroffe and Pembroke Campus Expansion

The DARE District and AC Library

In 2016, Algonquin College launched a $44.9-million building renovation project set to be complete by spring/summer of 2018. This renovation is taking place in the college's original 'C' building which houses most of the administration.

The purpose of this significant renovation is to improve the campus library and to provide a range of collaborative spaces for students, staff, and faculty to grow and learn. The new building has been called the DARE District with DARE standing for Discovery, Applied Research, and Entrepreneurship. The DARE District also holds the new Institute for Indigenous Entrepreneurship, which provides Indigenous Algonquin College students and alumni a collaborative space to access resources they need in order to develop or create businesses. This renovation has contributed to the environmental sustainability of the college's research and innovation infrastructure by transforming the northern wing of C building to a high-performance green building.

ACCE and Robert C. Gillett Student Commons

Opened in the fall of 2011, the  Algonquin Centre for Construction Excellence, designed by Edward J. Cuhaci & Associates Architects in joint venture with Diamond Schmitt Architects, houses 600 additional construction seats and provide space for thousands more students studying in related programs. The uniquely green, Leadership in Energy and Environmental Design (LEED) Platinum certified building showcases a teaching laboratory for best practices in sustainable construction. The new facility integrates the relocated bus station and a new below-grade transit roadway (yet to be completed) to the main campus via a $4 million pedestrian bridge constructed across Woodroffe Avenue.

Opened in the fall of 2012, the  Student Commons project is the result of a continued partnership between the College and its Students' Association. Unique to most Ontario colleges, the Algonquin College Students' Association operates many College services, ranging from the varsity athletics to the Algonquin Fitness Zone. Committed to securing additional social and study space for students, the SA Board of Directors, through consultation with its members, approved to designate part of its activity fee to secure $30 million to fund the new Student Commons. Recognizing this opportunity to improve and centralize student support services the College's Board of Governors approved the contribution of an additional $22 million in funding for the project.

Algonquin College Mobile Learning Centre is a computer lab, designed by Edward J. Cuhaci & Associates Architects, that delivers a collaborative learning environment using mobile and cloud computing technology.

Algonquin College Waterfront Pembroke Campus

Opened in fall 2012, the  expansion of the Pembroke Campus adds more than 300 full-time student spaces. These spaces are housed in a modernist building located on the Ottawa River in Pembroke, Ontario. The new waterfront campus is seen as a new beginning for the College, the City of Pembroke, and all of Renfrew County. A new facility would allow the College to grow, allowing it to better meet the labour market needs of Renfrew County's employers well into the future.

Programs
Algonquin's focus is on the arts and technology and promotes a strong focus on applied theory and practical experience. There are over 19,000 full-time students in more than 180 programs. There are 155 Ontario college programs, 18 apprenticeship programs, 40 co-op programs, 6 collaborative degree programs and 6 bachelor's degree programs. Some of these degrees are through direct collaborative partnerships with Carleton University and University of Ottawa.

Algonquin offers the following bachelor's degree programs: 
Bachelor of Interior Design (Honours); 
Bachelor of Commerce (E-Supply Chain Management) (Honours); 
Bachelor of Hospitality and Tourism Management (Honours); 
Bachelor of Public Safety (Honours); 
Bachelor of Information Technology – Network Technology 
Bachelor of Science in Nursing 
Bachelor of Early Learning and Community Development (Honours); and
Bachelor of Building Science (Honours).

The college's Woodroffe Campus boasts a fully functional (though non-broadcast) television studio with an adjoining control room, located in N Building. This is reserved for the students of the Broadcasting-Television program. Notable graduates from this program include director of the TV series 24, Jon Cassar and comedian Tom Green. The college used to have a second television studio, which now houses the Theatre Arts program. The college has one fully functional, broadcast radio station run entirely by the students of the Broadcasting-Radio program: CKDJ-FM, as well as an internet station: AIR - Algonquin, that is also broadcast as AIR AM 1700 via AM band.

The Algonquin College Animation Program is a three-year advanced diploma with its main focus on performance-based animation whether it be in 3D or traditional animation. Also, all students learn Toonboom's Harmony software. The program is celebrating its 20-year anniversary in 2009-10 and has its curriculum being taught in India, China and South Africa with negotiations with Dubai, Chile and others. The faculty of the program are veterans of the animation industry, all of whom have been at least departmental supervisors, many with over 20 years experience in the industry. Since the introduction of the three-year curriculum, graduates of the program have gone on to varied and rewarding jobs in the animation industry with over 93% of grads finding work in their chosen field, including a graduate Trent Correy who has worked on three Oscar-winning motion-pictures including Zootopia, as well as working on Moana. Student films have gone on to be screened in various festivals, featured on AWN TV (Charged) and won the prestigious ELAN award for best student film 2009 (Snared).

The Algonquin College Public Relations program is a two-year diploma in which students have raised notable amounts of money for local not-for-profit organizations including the John Howard Society, LiveWorkPlay, and Harmony House Women's Shelter. Since 1990, the Public Relations program has raised over $300,000 for charity.

The Pembroke Campus is well known for its outdoor training programs which attract students from across Canada.  These programs include Outdoor Adventure, Outdoor Adventure Naturalist and Forestry Technician.  In 2012, a new Waterfront Campus opened in downtown Pembroke.

International Campuses
Algonquin College has four international campuses through their international offshore partnerships:

 Manav Rachna International University (MRIU) – Faridabad, India
 Algonquin College (Orient Education Services Co) – Al-Naseem, Jahra, Kuwait
 Hotelski Educativni Centar (HEC) in Montenegro
  (JMI) in Nanjing, China

Residence
In August 2003, the Woodroffe Campus Residence Complex opened, providing housing for 1,050 students. There is also an abundance of off-campus housing in the area. Most students commute from throughout the National Capital Region by Ottawa's city transit, OC Transpo or by car. Full-time students have a transit pass included in their tuition fees to facilitate off-campus living and reduce the demand for parking on campus.

The school's residence is located just a short walk away from Baseline Station where students can take route 95 or route 94 to take them to the downtown core. There is also a clustering of apartment buildings and rental townhouses near the College called Deerfield where many second year students live.

The Pembroke Campus has a housing registry.

Algonquin College presidents

Partnerships

Algonquin has formed strategic partnerships with select universities to offer collaborative degrees. This includes the Bachelor of Information Technology - Interactive Multimedia and Design with Carleton University; Bachelor of Information Technology - Network Technology with Carleton University and Bachelor of Science in Nursing with the University of Ottawa. Studies take place at Algonquin College and the partnering university and collaborative degrees are conferred by the university. Algonquin has developed articulation agreements with universities to assist qualified Algonquin graduates to attain specific degrees in shorter periods. Graduates are subject to the admission requirements of the university granting the degree.

On February 16, 2017, Algonquin College announced a new partnership with The Ottawa Hospital in health research, innovation and training. The partnership, signed by Algonquin College President Cheryl Jensen and Executive Vice-President of Research at The Ottawa Hospital will be focused on digital health, clinical trials and biotherapeutics manufacturing. The partnership will stand for five years until requiring renewal.

Algonquin College has a partnership with Shopify, specifically Shopify U, which has added the study of graphic design to its course list. The partnership will allow students to attend classes at the downtown Ottawa Shopify office and then practice their newly learned skills by helping local businesses.

Internationally, the college has several partnerships with institutions in other countries to transfer expertise through technical assistance and training programs.

Scholarships
Algonquin College joined Project Hero, a scholarship program co founded by General (Ret'd) Rick Hillier for the families of fallen Canadian Forces members.

The Government of Canada sponsors an Indigenous Bursaries Search Tool that lists over 680 scholarships, bursaries, and other incentives offered by governments, universities, and industry to support Aboriginal post-secondary participation. Algonquin College bursaries for Aboriginal, First Nations and Métis students include: Peter Wintonick Bursary; Ottawa Police Service's Thomas G. Flanagan Scholarship; MKI Travel and Hospitality Bursary.

Military
The Diploma in Military Arts and Sciences (DMASc) provides Non-Commissioned Members (NCMs) of the Canadian Forces an online program made possible by a partnership between OntarioLearn (Algonquin College consortium member), the RMC, and the Canadian Defence Academy. Under a RMC and Algonquin College articulation agreement, all graduates of this diploma program who apply to the RMC will be admitted into the Bachelor of Military Arts and Sciences degree program with advanced standing.

In 2006, Algonquin College was approached by the Canadian Forces Support Training Group (CFSTG) to explore the feasibility of developing and delivering a program to satisfy the training requirements exclusively for Canadian Forces Geomatics Technicians. The goal was to increase the number of CF graduates produced by the School of Military Mapping. Students in the Geomatics Technician program earn a college-approved certificate in Geomatics. Algonquin College also grants a provincially approved Geomatics Technician Diploma to students who successfully graduate from the Geomatics Technician Training and have completed a small number of approved additional courses.

Sports
The name of Algonquin College's sports team is the Algonquin Thunder. Thor is the Algonquin College mascot. Algonquin is a member of the OCAA and the CCAA. Varsity teams compete in six sports on the provincial level within the OCAA. The Men's and Women's teams in basketball, soccer, and volleyball can qualify to compete for a "National Championship" as members of the CCAA.  Funding is provided by the Students' Association.

Algonquin Times
The student newspaper of Algonquin College is called the Algonquin Times, founded in 1986.  It is produced every two weeks during the fall and winter semesters by journalism and advertising students. Funding is provided by the Students' Association.

Glue Magazine 
Created and distributed for the first time in 2003, Glue Magazine has two deployments, with distribution being carried out twice a year- in September and in January. The issues and topics covered in the publication cover common student concerns such as money, food, friends, gaming, and more. The magazine is created via a collaborative effort between Algonquin College's Journalism and Advertising Marketing Communications students to further their skills in editing, managing promotional material and advertisements. Glue magazine is circulated at three main Ottawa post-secondary campuses including Algonquin College, Carleton University, and the University of Ottawa.

Services Available to the Public 
Algonquin College offers a variety of services to the public at a discounted rate from what is offered outside of the campus. By providing this service, the College allows its students to get hands-on, practical delivery of the theory learned in a classroom setting.

The services available for use by the public are:
 Hair Salon services: The hair salon at Algonquin College offers adult haircuts (for both men and women), children's haircuts, hair colouring and highlighting, perm, scalp therapy, hair relaxing, and extensions. These services are provided by the students enrolled in the Hairstyling program.
 Massage services: Members of the public are given complete massage therapy care by students in the Massage Therapy program, which includes an assessment of pain and discomfort, a massage treatment, hydrotherapy of deep moist heat or cold and information on self-care.
 Dental services: Provided by the students registered in the Dental Assistant and Dental Hygienist programs, the services available are restorative services, dental cleanings, preventative dental services for both adults and children, and tooth whitening treatments. Students are supervised by Registered Dental Hygienists and Dentists at all times.
 Restaurant International: Casual fine dining delivered in the on-site restaurant by students in the Culinary Arts program.
 Catering services
 Pet Adoption: Services provided through Algonquin College by the SPCA to make pets available for adoption. Facility veterinarians, student Veterinary Technicians and Veterinary Assistants ensure the pets made available for adoption are neutered, micro-chipped and vaccinated at the College.

Notable alumni and faculty 

 Abdiweli Sheikh Ahmed, Prime Minister of Somalia
 Germaine Arnaktauyok, Inuk printmaker, painter, and drawer
 Michael Barrett, Member of Parliament for Leeds—Grenville—Thousand Islands and Rideau Lakes
 Jason Blaine, Country music star
 Jon Cassar, Emmy-winning producer and director of the TV series 24
 Zdeno Chára, former NHL player
 Frank Cole, documentary filmmaker
 James Cybulski, TSN reporter
 Janice Dean, Fox News weather specialist
 Ben Delaney, sledge hockey player
 Jon Dore, comedian
 Tom Green, comedian
 Ricardo Larrivée, television host and food writer
 Chris Lovasz, internet personality and member of The Yogscast
 Massari, Canadian singer
 Neil Macdonald, CBC Washington Bureau Chief
 Norm Macdonald, Comedian
 Ian Millar, Olympic medal-winning equestrian
 Larry O'Brien, former Mayor of Ottawa and technology entrepreneur
 Dan O'Toole, SportsCentre anchor, former Fox Sports Live anchor
 Anthony Rota, Member of Parliament for Nipissing—Timiskaming, Speaker of the House of Commons
 Graham Sucha, Member of the Alberta Legislative Assembly, Calgary Shaw
 Katie Tallo, filmmaker and author
 Tim Tierney, City of Ottawa Councillor, Beacon Hill-Cyrville

See also 

 Higher education in Ontario
 List of colleges in Ontario

References

External links

  
 Algonquin Times homepage

 
Educational institutions established in 1967
Colleges in Ontario
1967 establishments in Ontario